Being the highest literate state in India, Kerala is home to some of the most reputed institutes for higher education in India.

Universities
The higher education system in India includes both private and public universities. Universities in India are recognised by the University Grants Commission (UGC), which draws its power from the University Grants Commission Act, 1956.The types of universities include:

Central Universities

State Universities

Deemed Universities

Colleges

 List of colleges affiliated with Kannur University
 List of colleges affiliated to University of Calicut
 List of colleges affiliated with Mahatma Gandhi University
 List of colleges affiliated to Kerala University
 List of colleges affiliated to Kerala University of Health Sciences
 List of colleges affiliated to Kerala Agricultural University
 List of colleges affiliated with Kerala University of Fisheries and Ocean Studies
 List of colleges affiliated with Cochin University of Science and Technology

Law colleges 
 Government Law College, Ernakulam
 Government Law College, Trivandrum
 Government Law College, Kozhikode
 Government Law College, Thrissur
 School Of Indian Legal Thought, Kottayam
 Kerala Law Academy Law College, Trivandrum
 Markaz Law College
 Sree Narayana Guru College of Legal Studies  
 Aligarh Muslim University, Malappuram Campus
Bharata Mata School of Legal Studies (BSOLS), [Aluva]
C.S.I College For Legal Studies Kanakkary,Kottayam
School of Legal Studies (Kannur university, Thalashery Campus ), [Palayad,Thalashery]

Business schools / MBA colleges / management departments 
 Amity Business School, Kochi
 Amrita School Of Business, Kochi
 Asian School of Business, Thiruvananthapuram
 Bhavans Royal Institute Of Management, Kochi
 Bishop Jerome Institute, Kollam
 Cochin University of Science and Technology
 DCSMAT Business School
 Farook Institute of Management Studies (FIMS), Calicut
 IIM, Kochi (campus of IIMK)
 IIM, Kozhikode
 IIITM-K, Trivandrum
 Indian Institute of Logistics, Kochi
Marian International Institute of Management (MIIM), Kuttikkanam, Idukki
 Marthoma College of Management and Technology (MCMAT), Perumbavoor, Ernakulam
Rajagiri Centre for Business Studies, Kochi
 School of Communication and Management Studies, Kochi
 TKM Institute of Management
 Travancore Business Academy, Kollam
 UEI Global
 Vidya Bharathi Institute Of Management And Technology, Kochi
 Xavier Institute of Management and Entrepreneurship
 Allama Iqbal Institute of Management
 Aligarh Muslim University, Malappuram Campus
 SCM Hub International Logistics Business School, Kochi Info Park Campus

Hotel management colleges 
 Naipunnya School Of Hotel Management, Cherthala
 Institute of Hotel Management and Catering Technology, Kovalam
 Munnar Catering College

Private colleges

 Amrita Vishwa Vidyapeetham, Kollam (headquartered in Coimbatore, Tamil Nadu)
 Lancon Institute of Cyber Security (LICS) ( EC-Council - USA ) NH, Vatakara
 V Institute, Kollam
 Adi Institute Of Quality Engineers, Kochi

Polytechnic colleges
 List of polytechnic colleges in Kerala

Architecture colleges
College of Architecture, Thiruvananthapuram, C.A.T
Bishop Jerome School of Architecture, Kollam
Asian School of Architecture & Design Innovation, Ernakulam, Kerala

Design institutes 
 Kerala State Institute of Design, Kollam
 Creative Hut Institute of Photography, Mattakkara, Kottayam
 Terrafirm Global Academy, City Centre Campus, Kadavanthara, Kochi
 Terrafirm Global Academy, Riverside Green Campus, Aluva, Kochi
 Irohub Infotech, Palarivattom, Kochi
 Cindrebay, Kaloor, Kochi

Engineering
 List of engineering colleges in Kerala

Medical
 List of medical colleges in Kerala

Maritime 
 Euro Tech Maritime Academy, Kochi
indian maritime university kochi

Pharmacy colleges

Medical laboratory technology colleges
 A.G.M. School OF PARAMEDICALS
 Alphonsa Para Medical School 
 Babes Paramedical Laboratory, Changanassery
 Mary Queens Medical Technological Laboratory, Thiruvalla
 Queen Mary's Medical Technological Laboratory, Karukachal
 S.G Laboratory, Mallappally
 St Julian Medical Technological Laboratory, Karukachal

Govt pharmacy colleges
 College of Pharmaceutical Science, Kozhikode, Kozhikode Medical College
 College of Pharmaceutical Science, Thiruvananthapuram, Medical College, Thiruvananthapuram
 Department of Pharmaceutical Sciences, Mahatma Gandhi University, Kottayam
 Academy of Pharmaceutical Sciences Pariyaram Medical College, Kannur

Private self financing pharmacy colleges
 A.M. College of Pharmacy, Vavvakkavu Post, Karunagappally, Kollam-690 528
 Alshifa College of Pharmacy, Perinthalmanna
 Amrita School of Pharmacy, AIMS Health Sciences Campus, Kochi
 Crescent B.Pharm College, Madayipara, Kannur
 The Dale View College of Pharmacy & Research Centre, Punalal PO, Thiruvananthapuram
 Devaki Amma Memorial College of Pharmacy, PO Pulliparamba, Chelembra, Malappuram
 Ezhuthachan National Academy Pharmacy, College & Research Institute, Maryamuttom, Neyyattinkara, Thiruvananthapuram
 Fathima College of Pharmacy, Kollam
 Grace College of Pharmacy, Palakkad
 JDT Islam College of Pharmacy, Marikunnu PO, Kozhikode
 Karuna College of Pharmacy, Iringuttoor, Palakkad Dist
 Malik Dinar College of Pharmacy, Seethagole, Kasaragode
 Mar Dioscorus College of Pharmacy, Sreekariyam, Thiruvananthapuram
 Naserath College of Pharmacy, Othera, Thiruvalla
 Nehru College of Pharmacy, near Lakkdi Railway Station, Thiruvillwamala, Thrissur
 Nirmala College of Pharmacy, Moovattupuzha
 Pharmacy College of St James Medical Academy, Govt. Hospital Road, Chalakkudy
 Pushpagiri College of Pharmacy, Perumthurthi PO, Pathanamthitta
 Royal College
 Sri Vidyadhiraja Pharmacy College, Thiruvananthapuram
 St. Joseph's College of Pharmacy, Muttom, Cherthala
 ELIMS College of Pharmacy, Villadam, Ramavarmapuram P O, Thrissur
 Hindustan College of Pharmacy, Kanjirapally, Kottayam
KTN college of pharmacy, chalavara, Palakkad

B.Ed colleges
 NSS Training College, Pandalam
 Al-azhar Training College, Thodupuzha
 Ansar Training College for Women, Perumpilavu, Trichur
 Arafa Teacher Education, Attur, Thrissur
 Indira Gandhi Training College, Kothamangalam
 Farook Training College, Calicut
 Kaviyattu College of Education, Pirappancode, Thiruvananthapuram, Kerala
 Mar Baselious Paulose II Training College, Puthencruz
 Mt Tabore Training College, Pathanapuram
 NSS Training College Ottapalam
 Sree Narayana Guru Kripa Trust BEd College, Pothencode, Thiruvananthapuram
 Titus II Teachers College, Thiruvalla
 Mar Osthatheos Training College, Akkikavu, Thrissur
 St. Gregorios Teachers'Training College, Meenangadi
 Aligarh Muslim University, Malappuram Campus

Teacher training institutes (TTI)
 Darul Uloom Teacher Training Institute, Thootha, Perinthalmanna
 Fazfari Teacher Training Institute, Padinjattummuri, Malappuram
 Mankada Orphanage Teacher Training Institute, Mankada, Perinthalmanna
 T.D. Teacher Training Institute, Mattancherry, Kochi-2

Autonomous institutions

See also

 ER&DCI Institute of Technology, Trivandrum
 National Institute of Electronics & Information Technology, Calicut
 Indian Institute of Technology in Kerala
 Indian Institute of Mass Communication, Kottayam 
 KEAM

References

Kerala